Stone House on Kentucky River is located in Prestonville, Kentucky.  It was built in 1835 and added to the National Register of Historic Places on January 8, 1987.

It is located on Kentucky River. It has a two-story, two bay ell built at the same time.

It is one of two known dry-stone houses in Carroll County.  It was deemed notable as "a good and rare
example of the transitional Federal/Greek Revival period."

References

National Register of Historic Places in Carroll County, Kentucky
Greek Revival architecture in Kentucky
Federal architecture in Kentucky
Houses completed in 1835
Houses in Carroll County, Kentucky
Houses on the National Register of Historic Places in Kentucky
1835 establishments in Kentucky
Central-passage houses
Stone houses in Kentucky
Kentucky River